Volansi (formerly Volans-i) is an American unmanned aerial vehicle logistics company. Founded in San Francisco, California in 2015, the company utilizes VTOL drones for commercial, medical and defense operations.

History

The company was founded in 2015 by former Tesla, Inc. senior operations analyst Hannan Parvizian and Wesley Zheng, who had been working for electric car manufacturer Lucid Motors. While at Stanford University, Zheng was a part of a team who researched an improved model of lithium–sulfur battery for use in renewable energy systems. Parvizian was inspired to create the company due to logistics issues that Tesla was facing, where manufacturing parts could not be sourced in a timely manner. The company was originally funded by Y Combinator, and the company presented their VTOL drones at a showcase in Austin, Texas in 2017. In July 2017, the company led a project that set "a new U.S. record for long-distance urban delivery by drone, using cellphone networks to help navigate a simulated 97-mile trip". The company opened a production facility in Concord, California.

Volansi first became involved in humanitarian relief in 2018, by working together with Merck & Co. and Direct Relief to develop a drone-based medical supply delivery system in Puerto Rico, securing inter-island flight permissions for the project. The company's preparations for creating the first hurricane relief drone were scampered in 2019 due to the damage caused by Hurricane Dorian to The Bahamas.

In March 2020, Volansi hired former Amazon Prime Air co-founder Daniel Buchmueller as their Chief Technology Officer. The company won the Airmanship Special Award at the 2020 African Drone Forum. The same year it began testing for vaccine deliveries in North Carolina with Merck.

In July 2022, Volansi filed for assignment for benefit of creditors (ABC), an alternative to bankruptcy.

Operations

Volansi's facilities are based in Concord, California, however the company operates globally. The drone services are offered on-demand, and can be used for commercial, medical and defense purposes. Packages are able to be delivered to any location with a suitable flat surface, including construction sites and ships at sea. To be able to operate, the company receives many exceptions to Federal Aviation Administration rules.

Volansi's VOLY M20 model has a maximum 350 mile range, depending on the payload and weather conditions. However, the company have tested prototypes that can travel at a 500-mile range, with a top speed of 67 miles per hour.

References

External links
 Volansi website

2015 establishments in California
Aircraft manufacturers of the United States